RMS Communications Group, Inc.,  doing business as CellForCash.com, was a company that bought used cellular handsets. CellForCash.com was located in Ocala, Florida. Its website allowed consumers and business to sell their cellular phones for cash. The website listed over 200 cell phones the company is willing to buy. Users selected a manufacturer and model and complete a registration. The company provided a box and a prepaid shipping label for mailing.

Environmental research organization Inform, Inc., projected that 130 million cell phones were retired in 2005 in the U.S., from which CNN estimated that undiscarded phones were approaching 500 million.

CellForCash.com shipped most noncharity phones to Latin America due to high demand. It had retrieved and recycled hundreds of thousands of unused phones since its inception.

Ratings
The Better Business Bureau rated RMS Communications Group, d.b.a. CellForCash.com, a grade F, with many complaints regarding its legitimacy and practices, noting the number of complaints filed against them, their failure to respond to most of the complaints, and the seriousness of many of the complaints. The largest categories of complaints are "Refund or Exchange Issues" and "Contract Issues".

See also
Electronic waste in the United States

References

External links
Cell For Cash

Companies based in Florida
Defunct computer companies of the United States
Electronic waste in the United States
Mobile phone recycling
Waste management companies of the United States